USS Flag was a screw steamship in the Union Navy during the American Civil War. She is listed as "3rd rate".

Service history
Flag was purchased on 26 April 1861 at Philadelphia as Phineas Sprague, converted as a warship at the Washington Navy Yard, and renamed and commissioned on 28 May 1861, Lieutenant Commander L. C. Sartori in command. When first armed, the ship had six 200-pounder Parrott rifles. In 1863 she was re-armed with one 300-pounder, four 200-pounder, and two 30-pounder Parrott rifles. Flag reported for duty in the South Atlantic Blockading Squadron at Charleston, South Carolina on 6 June 1861. Aside from periods in the North for repairs, she patrolled the coastal waters of the Carolinas until early 1865. Flag captured or shared in the capture of many blockade runners.

She participated in the capture of Fernandina, Florida in March 1862, and in the general engagement of the fleet with the forts in Charleston Harbor on 7 April 1863. She returned to New York on 16 February 1865, was decommissioned there on 25 February, and sold on 12 July.

See also

Union Navy
Battle of Fort Pulaski

References

 

Ships of the Union Navy
Steamships of the United States Navy
Gunboats of the United States Navy
American Civil War patrol vessels of the United States
1861 ships